= Soldier King =

Soldier King may refer to:

- Frederick William I of Prussia (r. 1713-1740)
- Peter IV of Portugal (r. 1826)
- Victor Emmanuel III of Italy (r. 1900-1946)
- Albert I of Belgium (r. 1909-1934)
